Polnareff's is an album by Michel Polnareff released in 1971 on AZ Disques. At the time of its release, Polnareff was "one of the most successful musicians in France", according to The Independent. The album reflected some very personal and serious issues for Polnareff, including the suicide of Europe 1 radio director Lucien Morisse, a close friend, to whom the song "Qui a tué grand'maman?" was dedicated. The album was remixed in quadraphonic for release in Japan in 1972.  In 1997, the album was first reissued on compact disc by Universal Records, along with his albums Le Bal des Lazes and Love Me, Please Love Me.

Track list 
 "Voyages" (M. Polnareff) – 2:52
 "Né dans un ice-cream" (J.-L. Dabadie, M. Polnareff) – 3:22
 "Petite, petite" (J.-L. Dabadie, M. Polnareff) – 3:20
 "Computer's Dream" (M. Polnareff) – 4:16
 "Le désert n'est plus en Afrique" (M. Polnareff, M. Polnareff) – 3:04
 "Nos mots d'amour" (J.-L. Dabadie, M. Polnareff) – 3:13
 "...Mais encore" (M. Polnareff) – 2:15
 "Qui a tué grand'maman ?" (M. Polnareff, M. Polnareff) – 2:37
 "Monsieur l'Abbé" (M. Polnareff, M. Polnareff) – 3:30
 "Hey You Woman" (P. Delanoe, M. Polnareff) – 5:21
 "À minuit, à midi" (J.-L. Dabadie, M. Polnareff) – 3:36

Reception

Thom Jurek of AllMusic described the album as a "psychedelic pop masterpiece", "so bloody well-executed and produced, it cannot be anything but brilliant ... pretentious French psychedelic soul at its most garish and essential."

Personnel

Performance

Michel Polnareff

Technical
Jean-Loup Dabadie – text
Pierre Delanoé – text
Peter Gallen – assistant
Paul Holland – sound recording
Anthony King – arranger, orchestra director
Barry Kingston – collaboration
Jean- Marie Perier – photography
François Plassat – illustrations
Michel Polnareff – vocals, piano, mellotron, organ, electric piano, guitars, percussions, xylophone, bass, arranger, orchestra director
Bill Shepherd – arranger, orchestra director

Releases

References

1971 albums
Michel Polnareff albums